USS Harrier (AM-366) was an  built for the United States Navy. Laid down on 11 August 1943 by the Willamette Iron and Steel Works, Portland, Oregon, launched 7 June 1944, commissioned as USS Harrier (AM-366), 31 October 1945.

History 
After shakedown and exercises along the Oregon coast, Harrier put into San Diego, California, 5 January 1946. She decommissioned, 28 March 1946 at San Diego, California. Struck from the Naval Register, 1 December 1959. Transferred to the Maritime Commission, sold in 1964 and was renamed Sea Scope. The ship was reclassified for oceanographic research and was equipped with a variety of underwater tools including sonar, photographic equipment, magnetic and seabed exploration equipment.  It is reported to have been used, circa 1970, to reconnoiter the site of the Soviet K-129 sub prior to the CIA project Azorian/Glomar Explorer to recover part of that sub in 1974. It was renamed Atlantic Coast in 1998.

References

External links
 NavSource Online: Mine Warfare Vessel Photo Archive - Harrier (AM 366)

Admirable-class minesweepers
Ships built in Portland, Oregon
1944 ships
World War II minesweepers of the United States
Cold War minesweepers of the United States